Invernaver (Gaelic: Inbhir Nabhair) is a small, remote hamlet, situated on the west bank of the River Naver as it flows into Torrisdale Bay, in Sutherland, Scottish Highlands and is in the Scottish council area of Highland.

The village of Bettyhill is situated less than 1 mile northeast from Invernaver across the river.

References

Populated places in Sutherland